Sarmentypnum is a genus of mosses belonging to the family Calliergonaceae.

The genus has cosmopolitan distribution.

Species:
 Sarmentypnum exannulatum (Schimp.) Hedenäs
 Sarmentypnum luipichense (R.S.Williams) Hedenäs

References

Hypnales
Moss genera